Paterangi is a settlement in the Waikato region of New Zealand's North Island. It is located 10 km northwest of Te Awamutu. It is close to the site of one of the most strongly fortified pa built during the New Zealand wars of the late 19th century.

The Pa was called Tauranga Mirumiru and was home to the Ngati Apakura. The site of the Pa is located on a local dairy farm.

In Paterangi lies the largest peat lake in the Waikato, Lake Ngaroto. Translated into English, Ngaroto simply means 'the lake.' In Lake Ngaroto the wooden carving identified as the Maori rainbow god 'Uenuku' was found. Uenuku now rests in the Te Awamutu Museum.

William James Scott, a Scottish-born Canadian politician moved to Paterangi in 1867 and established himself as a wealthy landowner.

Demographics
The SA1 area is part of the larger Lake Ngaroto statistical area.

The SA1 area had a population of 132 at the 2018 New Zealand census, an increase of 12 people (10.0%) since the 2013 census, and an increase of 36 people (37.5%) since the 2006 census. There were 54 households, comprising 66 males and 66 females, giving a sex ratio of 1.0 males per female. The median age was 39.7 years (compared with 37.4 years nationally), with 30 people (22.7%) aged under 15 years, 18 (13.6%) aged 15 to 29, 66 (50.0%) aged 30 to 64, and 18 (13.6%) aged 65 or older.

Ethnicities were 90.9% European/Pākehā, 9.1% Māori, 2.3% Pacific peoples, and 6.8% other ethnicities. People may identify with more than one ethnicity.

Although some people chose not to answer the census's question about religious affiliation, 43.2% had no religion, and 38.6% were Christian.

Of those at least 15 years old, 18 (17.6%) people had a bachelor's or higher degree, and 21 (20.6%) people had no formal qualifications. The median income was $45,200, compared with $31,800 nationally. 21 people (20.6%) earned over $70,000 compared to 17.2% nationally. The employment status of those at least 15 was that 72 (70.6%) people were employed full-time, and 15 (14.7%) were part-time.

Lake Ngaroto statistical area

Lake Ngaroto had a population of 1,170 at the 2018 New Zealand census, an increase of 90 people (8.3%) since the 2013 census, and an increase of 123 people (11.7%) since the 2006 census. There were 417 households, comprising 606 males and 567 females, giving a sex ratio of 1.07 males per female. The median age was 38.8 years (compared with 37.4 years nationally), with 243 people (20.8%) aged under 15 years, 219 (18.7%) aged 15 to 29, 573 (49.0%) aged 30 to 64, and 135 (11.5%) aged 65 or older.

Ethnicities were 91.5% European/Pākehā, 10.0% Māori, 0.5% Pacific peoples, 3.3% Asian, and 2.6% other ethnicities. People may identify with more than one ethnicity.

The percentage of people born overseas was 11.0, compared with 27.1% nationally.

Although some people chose not to answer the census's question about religious affiliation, 50.3% had no religion, 36.4% were Christian, 0.3% had Māori religious beliefs, 0.5% were Hindu, 0.5% were Buddhist and 1.3% had other religions.

Of those at least 15 years old, 174 (18.8%) people had a bachelor's or higher degree, and 144 (15.5%) people had no formal qualifications. The median income was $46,900, compared with $31,800 nationally. 249 people (26.9%) earned over $70,000 compared to 17.2% nationally. The employment status of those at least 15 was that 591 (63.8%) people were employed full-time, 150 (16.2%) were part-time, and 12 (1.3%) were unemployed.

Education

The school opened in 1876.

See also
 Invasion of Waikato

External links
Map
Photo of Paterangi war memorial
 Paterangi school

References

Populated places in Waikato
Waipa District